The 2018–19 season was the Manitoba Junior Hockey League's (MJHL) 102nd year of operation.  The Portage Terriers defeated the Swan Valley Stampeders to win the Turnbull Cup for the ninth time in fifteen years.

Season notes
The MJHL reduces the number of 20-year-old players permitted on each team's roster from nine to eight, with the ultimate target of six by 2021. 
The MJHL renames the MJHL Top Goaltender Award as the Ed Belfour Top Goaltender Trophy.
The annual Showcase takes place at Seven Oaks Arena in Winnipeg from December 9-12, 2018.
The MJHL and SJHL hold a joint showcase in Regina, Saskatchewan January 14-15, 2019.
Former OCN Blizzard player Brady Keeper signs a National Hockey League entry-level contract with the Florida Panthers.
The Portage Terriers win their fourth Turnbull Cup in five seasons after defeating the Swan Valley Stampeders 4-games-to-3 in the finals.

Standings

Playoffs

Post MJHL playoffs
ANAVET Cup
Portage Terriers defeated Battlefords North Stars 4-games-to-1
2019 National Junior A Championship
Portage Terriers finish fifth (0-4-0) in the round robin and are eliminated from the playoffs

League awards 
 Steve "Boomer" Hawrysh Award (MVP): Josh Tripp, Swan Valley
 Ed Belfour Top Goaltender Trophy: Jeremy Link, Winnipeg
 Brian Kozak Award (Top Defenceman): Quinton Sudom, Swan Valley
 Vince Leah Trophy (Rookie of the Year): Owen Murray, Portage
 Frank McKinnon Memorial Trophy (Hockey Ability and Sportsmanship): Ben Dalke, Virden
 Muzz McPherson Award (Coach of the Year): Blake Spiller, Portage
 Mike Ridley Trophy (Scoring Champion): Josh Tripp, Swan Valley
 MJHL Playoff MVP:

See also
ANAVET Cup
2019 National Junior A Championship

References

External links
 MJHL Website
 2018-19 MJHL season at HockeyDB.com

Manitoba Junior Hockey League seasons
MJHL